Gangal is a village situated in the administrative sub-division Fateh Jang tehsil of Attock District, Punjab,  Pakistan.

Villages in Attock District